Manuel Ruz Baños (born 5 April 1986) is a Spanish retired professional footballer who played as a right back.

Club career
A product of Valencia CF's youth ranks, Valencia-born Ruz managed to appear three times in La Liga with its first team, all during the 2004–05 season. He then moved for Gimnàstic de Tarragona and remained there for two years, the first on loan.

For 2007–08, Ruz joined newly formed Granada 74 CF. At the end of the campaign, with the club relegated, he stayed in Segunda División, signing with Hércules CF.

In November 2009, during the 1–0 win at UD Almería for the Copa del Rey (3–1 aggregate success), Ruz suffered a dangerous challenge from Guilherme which resulted in a severe knee injury. He was subsequently sidelined for the rest of the season.

On 2 September 2010, Ruz returned to Gimnàstic. After only one official appearance, he ruptured the ligaments and meniscus in his left knee during training, missing the vast majority of the second division campaign; his return to action only took place on 15 May 2011, when he played the full 90 minutes in a 3–1 home win against eventual champions Real Betis as his team eventually managed to escape relegation.

On 3 July 2012, after two seasons with Nàstic, suffering relegation in his second, Ruz was released. Ten days later he signed a contract with Xerez CD also in the second level, again featuring rarely due to physical problems, this time a pericardium condition.

References

External links

1986 births
Living people
Footballers from Valencia (city)
Spanish footballers
Association football defenders
La Liga players
Segunda División players
Segunda División B players
Tercera División players
Valencia CF Mestalla footballers
Valencia CF players
Gimnàstic de Tarragona footballers
Granada 74 CF footballers
Hércules CF players
Xerez CD footballers
Spain youth international footballers